Bombycopsis is a genus of moths in the family Lasiocampidae. The genus was erected by father and son entomologists Cajetan and Rudolf Felder.

Species
Bombycopsis abyssinica Joannou & Krüger, 2009
Bombycopsis accola Joannou & Krüger, 2009
Bombycopsis allophyes Joannou & Krüger, 2009
Bombycopsis alpina Joannou & Krüger, 2009
Bombycopsis belzebub Joannou & Krüger, 2009
Bombycopsis bipars Walker, 1855
Bombycopsis birketsmithi Joannou & Krüger, 2009
Bombycopsis blanda Joannou & Krüger, 2009
Bombycopsis capicola Aurivillius, 1921
Bombycopsis caryoxantha Joannou & Krüger, 2009
Bombycopsis castaneipennis Joannou & Krüger, 2009
Bombycopsis coenophanes Joannou & Krüger, 2009
Bombycopsis conspersa Aurivillius, 1905
Bombycopsis curvilinea Joannou & Krüger, 2009
Bombycopsis dargei Joannou & Krüger, 2009
Bombycopsis exigua Joannou & Krüger, 2009
Bombycopsis funebris Joannou & Krüger, 2009
Bombycopsis fuscata Joannou & Krüger, 2009
Bombycopsis gallagheri Wiltshire & Legrain, 1997
Bombycopsis geertsemai Joannou & Krüger, 2009
Bombycopsis germana Joannou & Krüger, 2009
Bombycopsis hyatti Tams, 1931
Bombycopsis indecora Walker, 1865
Bombycopsis kalongensis Joannou & Krüger, 2009
Bombycopsis kenema Joannou & Krüger, 2009
Bombycopsis kikuyuensis Joannou & Krüger, 2009
Bombycopsis kipengerica Joannou & Krüger, 2009
Bombycopsis knysna Joannou & Krüger, 2009
Bombycopsis larseni Wiltshire & Legrain, 1997
Bombycopsis latipennis Joannou & Krüger, 2009
Bombycopsis ledereri (Koçak, 1981)
Bombycopsis lepalea Joannou & Krüger, 2009
Bombycopsis lepta Tams, 1931
Bombycopsis leptifictrix Joannou & Krüger, 2009
Bombycopsis manengubica Joannou & Krüger, 2009
Bombycopsis manica Joannou & Krüger, 2009
Bombycopsis manowensis Joannou & Krüger, 2009
Bombycopsis melaena Joannou & Krüger, 2009
Bombycopsis mesochrotes Joannou & Krüger, 2009
Bombycopsis metallicus Distant, 1898
Bombycopsis murphyi Joannou & Krüger, 2009
Bombycopsis ndolae Joannou & Krüger, 2009
Bombycopsis nephelograpta Joannou & Krüger, 2009
Bombycopsis nigrovittata
Bombycopsis nubila Joannou & Krüger, 2009
Bombycopsis obscurior Joannou & Krüger, 2009
Bombycopsis occidentalis Joannou & Krüger, 2009
Bombycopsis ochroleuca Felder, 1874
Bombycopsis oligolepis Joannou & Krüger, 2009
Bombycopsis orthogramma
Bombycopsis pallida Joannou & Krüger, 2009
Bombycopsis perstrigata Joannou & Krüger, 2009
Bombycopsis pithex Joannou & Krüger, 2009
Bombycopsis pittawayi Wiltshire & Legrain, 1997
Bombycopsis punctimarginata Joannou & Krüger, 2009
Bombycopsis respondens Joannou & Krüger, 2009
Bombycopsis robusta Joannou & Krüger, 2009
Bombycopsis rubescens Joannou & Krüger, 2009
Bombycopsis rufa Joannou & Krüger, 2009
Bombycopsis rufobrunnea Joannou & Krüger, 2009
Bombycopsis ruwenzorica Joannou & Krüger, 2009
Bombycopsis seydeli Joannou & Krüger, 2009
Bombycopsis sheppardi Joannou & Krüger, 2009
Bombycopsis sodalis Joannou & Krüger, 2009
Bombycopsis stepheni Joannou & Krüger, 2009
Bombycopsis swaenepoeli Joannou & Krüger, 2009
Bombycopsis tenera Joannou & Krüger, 2009
Bombycopsis tephrobaphes Joannou & Krüger, 2009
Bombycopsis tessmanni Joannou & Krüger, 2009
Bombycopsis tsitsikama Joannou & Krüger, 2009
Bombycopsis tukuyuensis Joannou & Krüger, 2009
Bombycopsis ulugurica Joannou & Krüger, 2009
Bombycopsis usambarensis Joannou & Krüger, 2009
Bombycopsis ustulistriga Joannou & Krüger, 2009
Bombycopsis variabilis Joannou & Krüger, 2009
Bombycopsis varians Joannou & Krüger, 2009
Bombycopsis varidentata Joannou & Krüger, 2009
Bombycopsis venosa Butler, 1895
Bombycopsis venosoides Joannou & Krüger, 2009
Bombycopsis vicina Joannou & Krüger, 2009
Bombycopsis watulegei Joannou & Krüger, 2009
Bombycopsis zombina Joannou & Krüger, 2009
Bombycopsis zwicki Joannou & Krüger, 2009

References

Lasiocampidae